Traveller Double Adventure 1: Shadows/Annic Nova is a 1980 role-playing game adventure for Traveller published by Game Designers' Workshop.

Contents
Shadows/Annic Nova is a double adventure providing two separate scenarios, with each beginning with a list of pre-generated characters, equipment and introductory material.

Reception
Tony Watson reviewed Shadows/Annic Nova in The Space Gamer No. 29. Watson commented that "Overall, Shadows/Annic Nova is an interesting supplement for Traveller. The situations it describes should provide the players with a number of intriguing adventures, and even if the settings described aren't used exactly as given, they should provide an enterprising referee with enough ideas to set up a similar game scenario on his own. While Shadows/Annic Nova can easily be omitted from a player's Traveller collection, the dedicated referee will not want to be without it."

See also
Classic Traveller Double Adventures

References

Role-playing game supplements introduced in 1980
Traveller (role-playing game) adventures